George John McManus (1806 – October 18, 1887) was an Ontario political figure. He represented Cardwell in the Legislative Assembly of Ontario as a Liberal-Conservative Party Member of Provincial Parliament from 1871 to 1874.

McManus was born in Mountnugent, Kilbride Parish, County Cavan, Ireland, grew up there and settled in Mono Township in the summer of 1829. He was reeve for the township (1851-1873) and served as warden for Simcoe County in 1859. McManus was named superintendent of schools in 1844 and also served as justice of the peace (appointed clerk, Simcoe Co. 8th Division Court, 1848) and a lieutenant-colonel in the local militia. In 1831, he married Anne Carson (9 children); he married Alice Ann Kells (0 children) in 1866 after Anne's death.

References

External links 

The Canadian parliamentary companion and annual register, 1874, HJ Morgan
A History of Simcoe County, AF Hunter (1909)
History of Dufferin County, S. Sawden (1952)

1806 births
1887 deaths
Politicians from County Cavan
Immigrants to Upper Canada
Irish emigrants to pre-Confederation Ontario
Progressive Conservative Party of Ontario MPPs